Gravitcornutia nasifera is a species of moth of the family Tortricidae. It is found in Santa Catarina, Brazil.

The wingspan is 13 mm. The ground colour of the forewings is white with grey suffusions and some grey and blackish dots. The markings are black grey. The hindwings are brownish cream.

Etymology
The species name refers to the process of the aedeagus and is derived from Latin nasus (meaning nose) and ferro (meaning I carry).

References

Moths described in 2010
Gravitcornutia
Moths of South America
Taxa named by Józef Razowski